The Maumturks or Maamturks (mountains of the boar's pass) is a mountain range in Connemara,  County Galway, in the west of Ireland. It is a long, broadly-straight range, consisting of weathered quartzite peaks in its central section. The Maumturks lie east of the Twelve Bens, on the other side of Lough Inagh and the Inagh Valley (a Western Way route).

Hill walking
The walk of the full range (from Maam Cross to Leenaun), is considered one of the "great classic ridge-walks of Ireland", and since 1975, the University College Galway Mountaineering Club, has run the annual "Maamturks Challenge", a walk covering the entire 25–kilometre range in a single day.

List of peaks
The table below lists some of the highest major mountain peaks of the Maumturk Mountains.

(‡) The anglicised version is rarely used or marked on any maps; a more common anglicised name is the incorrect name of "Barrslievenaroy" (or "Baurslievenaroy"), which is a nearby townland on the slopes of Binn idir an Da Log.
(*) Cartographer Tim Robinson notes: "the Ordnance Survey has been incorrectly calling this mountain 'Leckavrea' for a hundred and fifty years." "Lackavrea" (Ir. Leic Aimhréidh) is the mountain to the east on the other side of Mám Aodha.

Rock climbing
While the Maumturks are not known for rock climbing, the Loch Mhám Ochóige area of the range has rock climbs in the V-Diff to HVS grades.

Further reading

See also
Mweelrea, major range in Killary Harbour
Twelve Bens, major range in Connemara
Lists of mountains in Ireland
Lists of mountains and hills in the British Isles

Notes

References

External links

 The Maamturks Challenge, University College Galway Mountaineering Club
 The Maamturks Challenge: Routecard (2015)
 Mountainview: The Maumturks Range
 The Maumturks Ridge Walk: Illustrated Guide

Connemara
Mountains and hills of County Galway
Gaeltacht places in County Galway